The Last Resort is an Australian reality television series that debuted on the Nine Network on 9 May 2017. The show features five long-term couples who take part in a social experiment in an attempt to save their troubled relationships, with a tropical island as the backdrop. The couples have been struck by problems of infidelity, trust, and intimacy. After a month of intensive relationship bootcamp with Australia's leading relationship experts, the couples either call it quits or commit to each other forever.

Couples

Ratings

References

2017 Australian television series debuts
2017 Australian television series endings
Australian dating and relationship reality television series
2010s Australian reality television series
English-language television shows
Nine Network original programming